Mao Zejian (5 October 1905 – 20 August 1929) was a cousin of Mao Zedong who was executed by the Kuomintang. She was the daughter of Zedong's paternal uncle Weisheng Mao and aunt Mrs. Chen. However, Zejian lived with Mao Zedong's parents from the age of 5 as her father could not afford to feed her. After Zedong's parents died in 1920, Zejian unwillingly married a fruit seller in Changsha at the age of 15, as a child bride, where she was maltreated in the new family. In 1921 she divorced her husband and followed Zedong Mao to Changsha, where she attended women's polytechnic school. She joined the Communist Party in 1923, and changed her name to Daxiang Mao. In the same year she was admitted to Hengyang Provincial Third Women's Normal School. She married a communist member Fen Chen in 1925. In 1928 she joined the Hunan uprising led by De Zhu and Yi Chen in Leiyang. Since then she led uprising activities as a female guerrilla soldier around Hunan Province. In May 1928 she was caught in a guerrilla activity together with her husband Fen Chen. She was tortured in prison. Her young child born in prison was killed by Kuomintang authorities shortly after birth. She was executed at Hengshan, Hunan Province on 20 August 1929.

References

1905 births
1929 deaths
People from Xiangtan
Mao Zedong family
Chinese guerrillas